LeftRightLeftRightLeft is the second live album by British alternative rock band Coldplay. It was released on 15 May 2009 and given away for free at all of the remaining concerts on the Viva la Vida Tour, being also available as a free download on the band's official website. However, the album was removed before the release of Live 2012. On 13 August 2021, nearly twelve years after its first release, the album was made available on streaming services. 

Regarding the limited release, Chris Martin stated that the purpose was to show gratitude: "Although it's live, it's supposed to be a real album, part of our canon. Y'know, as well as being a gift move, it is also a musical move. It's meant to say that this is what we sound like at the moment." Within six days, it was downloaded 3.5 million times. 

The band also noted that "playing live is what [they] love" and that the album is "a thank you to [their] fans", which are "the people who give [them] a reason to do it and make it happen". The material used was "recorded in over 101 locations", with producer Dan Green picking the tracks he thought were the best along with Coldplay's creative director Phil Harvey.

Critical reception 
Stephen M. Deusner from Pitchfork wrote a positive review for the album, noting that it "showcases a band much more comfortable and commanding on stage" in comparison to Coldplay Live 2003. He also commented that "all the big moments they've tried to create in the studio finally come alive on these tracks".

Track listing 
All tracks written by Coldplay (Guy Berryman, Jonny Buckland, Will Champion and Chris Martin).Notes
 Tracks 1, 5, 7 and 8 were recorded in Sydney, 2009.
 Tracks 2, 3, 4 and 9 were recorded in Madrid, 2008.
 Track 6 was recorded in Paris, 2008.
Mixed at The Bakery, mastered at Gateway Studios.

Personnel
Coldplay
 Guy Berryman – bass guitar, backing vocals, percussion, mandolin
 Jonny Buckland – electric guitar, backing vocals, keyboards
 Will Champion – drums, percussion, backing vocals; lead vocals & acoustic guitar ("Death Will Never Conquer")
 Chris Martin – lead vocals, piano, acoustic guitar, keyboards; harmonica ("Death Will Never Conquer")

Technical personnel
 Dan Green – production, mixing
 Rik Simpson – production, mixing
 Tony Smith – recording assistant
 Andy Rugg – mixing assistant
 Bob Ludwig – mastering

Release history

References

External links
 
 

2009 live albums
Albums free for download by copyright owner
Albums produced by Rik Simpson
Capitol Records live albums
Coldplay live albums
Parlophone live albums